Martin Chabada (born June 14, 1977) is a Czech professional ice hockey player currently with HC Litoměřice of the 1. národní hokejová liga (CZE.1). He has formerly played with HC Sparta Praha of the Czech Extraliga and Luleå HF in the Swedish Hockey League. He was originally drafted 252nd overall in the 2002 NHL Entry Draft by the New York Islanders.

Career statistics

External links 
 
 

1977 births
Czech ice hockey left wingers
EHC Biel players
Bridgeport Sound Tigers players
Luleå HF players
Living people
New York Islanders draft picks
Sportspeople from Kladno
HC Lev Poprad players
Södertälje SK players
HC Sparta Praha players
Czech expatriate ice hockey players in the United States
Czech expatriate ice hockey players in Sweden
Czech expatriate ice hockey players in Slovakia
Czech expatriate ice hockey players in Switzerland